Defending champion Esther Vergeer and her partner Jiske Griffioen defeated Korie Homan and Sharon Walraven in the final, 6–4, 6–4 to win the women's doubles wheelchair tennis title at the 2008 French Open.

Maaike Smit and Vergeer were the reigning champions, but Smit chose not to participate.

Seeds
 Jiske Griffioen /  Esther Vergeer (champions)
 Korie Homan /  Sharon Walraven (final)

Draw

Finals

External links
Draw

Wheelchair Women's Doubles
French Open, 2008 Women's Doubles